Velika Ludina is a municipality in Croatia in the Sisak-Moslavina County. It has a population of 2,831 (2001 census), 98.06% which are Croats.

Municipalities of Croatia
Populated places in Sisak-Moslavina County